Maryam Henein is a Canadian-born investigative journalist, activist, alternative medicine practitioner, filmmaker, and entrepreneur. She directed the documentary Vanishing of the Bees narrated by Elliot Page.

Henein has been accused of spreading misinformation about COVID-19.

Early life and education
Henein is a native of Montreal, Quebec, Canada. She interviewed documentarian Morgan Spurlock for Penthouse, and also produced documentaries for the UK’s September Films on subjects that include pimps, drug dealers and porn stars in the Los Angeles area. She was also part of First Apartment, a reality show webcast in the late 1990s and early 2000s on the now-defunct website crushedplanet.com, produced by Joe and Harry Gantz of Taxicab Confessions.

Career

Vanishing of the Bees
With George Langworthy, Henein directed the 2010 documentary (which took five years to produce), Vanishing of the Bees with Elliot Page narrating the film.

HoneyColony
Henein is the founder of HoneyColony Inc., a member-supported online magazine that hosts a number of optimized-health and investigative writers called "Hive Advisers".

Of Bees & Men
Henein continues to work on projects involving bees and contamination of the food supply. She is working on a memoir titled Of Bees & Men and launched a year-long Save the Bees campaign in June 2014.

Controversy 

Henein is an adherent of the conspiracy theory that the COVID-19 pandemic was planned by authorities.

Henein was the subject of a 2020 report by Media Matters for America, a liberal media watchdog group, documenting her website's medical misinformation, such as the false claim that vaccines cause autism. Henein was one of several individuals who subsequently received written warnings from the US Food and Drug Administration over the advertisement of chelated silver, vitamin C, and magnesium for preventative use against COVID-19. Henein maintained she did not commit any fault, and amended her website in accordance with the FDA's requirements.

Filmography

Film

Notes

References

External links
 Official site of HoneyColony.com
 

American documentary filmmakers
American women journalists
Journalists from Montreal
Film directors from Montreal
American people of Egyptian descent
Canadian people of Egyptian descent
Canadian emigrants to the United States
Canadian documentary film directors
Living people
Canadian women film directors
American women documentary filmmakers
Year of birth missing (living people)
Canadian women documentary filmmakers